Trepobates floridensis is a species of water strider in the family Gerridae. It is found throughout Florida into southern Georgia and west to Mississippi.

References

Trepobatinae
Insects described in 1928